Tando Jam railway station (Sindhi: ٽنڊو ڄام ريلوي اسٽيشن) is located in Tando Jam, Sindh, Pakistan.

See also
 List of railway stations in Pakistan
 Pakistan Railways

References

External links

Railway stations in Sindh
Railway stations on Hyderabad–Khokhrapar Branch Line